Days of Magic, Nights of War (2004) is the second book in a series of five by author Clive Barker, called The Books of Abarat. This volume contains the adventures of Candy Quackenbush an ordinary girl from Minnesota, in the strange fantasy world of Abarat. Abarat: Days of Magic, Nights of War is followed by, Absolute Midnight, which will be followed by a fourth and fifth book to complete the saga. The book tied with Steve Burt's Oddest Yet for the 2004 Bram Stoker Award for Best Work for Young Readers.

Plot summary
The entire book is spread out over eight weeks of time, compared to the two or three in Book 1, titled simply Abarat. The book picks up several weeks after the original had left off; Candy Quackenbush and Malingo the Geshrat (a character introduced in the first book) have traveled from Hour to Hour to evade the bounty hunter Otto Houlihan. Christopher Carrion's whereabouts are revealed only in the second quarter of the book, wherein he plots with the Sacbrood in the Pyramids of Xuxux. Sacbrood are terrifying insects of all shapes and sizes which Christopher Carrion has been breeding in order to help him create Absolute Midnight. Under the cover produced by the Sacbrood, he expects, the destroyers called the Requiax will emerge from under the Sea of Izabella (which surrounds the Abarat) and annihilate everything they see, giving Carrion the opportunity to re-organize the world according to his will.

Candy begins to develop powers of great magic, with which she frees the mysterious beings called Totemix from their imprisonment in the Twilight Palace on the island of Scoriae. Malingo, separated from her on the carnival island of Babilonium, joins with others of Candy's acquaintance to form a force of resistance against the armies of Midnight. Candy is eventually captured by Letheo, the lizard-boy servant of Christopher Carrion, and taken to the island Efreet.

The enchantress Diamanda, having died of an encounter with a monster, travels as a ghost to the human world, where she finds her also ghostly husband Henry and with him works to prepare Candy's home town for the flood resulting from its imminent meeting with the Abarat. When this meeting occurs, Henry's opening of the factory farm which is the town's only industrial outlet is used as a comment on the variety-deprived lives of chickens raised in such factories.

This book introduces readers to new characters including Finnegan Hob, the would-be husband of Princess Boa, who is discovered by other characters in search of himself. Having persuaded him to give up his vendetta against the Abaratian dragons, whom he blames for his fianceé's death, the seekers travel to Efreet, where Candy is held prisoner by Christopher Carrion. They rescue Candy and at her request return her to the human world, where she intends to hide from the Abarat's perils. The two worlds meet in a dramatic climax, wherein it is revealed by the magician Kaspar Wolfswinkel that Princess Boa's soul is contained within Candy's body, having been placed there by the Fantomaya in obedience to the belief that Princess Boa, or her reincarnation, could halt the Abarat's progressive degradation and revitalize the Abarat as a whole. Christopher Carrion clashes with his grandmother Mater Motley, having learned that she had concealed Candy's dual nature from him, and is severely wounded in the process (whether he dies or not is unclear).

Candy and most of the major characters return to the Abarat when it is withdrawn from the human world. There, Mater Motley assumes control of Gorgossium Island, where she executes all of Christopher Carrion's living supporters. The remains of Kaspar Wolfswinkel's six hats, the source of his power, are left in the human world.

References

External links
 The Beautiful Moment - The Official Clive Barker Website for All Ages - official site celebrating the work of Clive Barker for younger readers - features Abarat and The Thief of Always.
 Revelations - The Official Clive Barker Online Resource - includes a full bibliography, filmography and frequently updated news.

2004 British novels
2004 fantasy novels
Novels by Clive Barker
Young adult fantasy novels
British young adult novels
Abarat
HarperCollins books
Bram Stoker Award for Best Work for Young Readers winners